Abell 1689 is a galaxy cluster in the constellation Virgo over 2.3 billion light-years away.

Details
Abell 1689 is one of the biggest and most massive galaxy clusters known and acts as a gravitational lens, distorting the images of galaxies that lie behind it. It has the largest system of gravitational arcs ever found.

Abell 1689 shows over 160,000 globular clusters, the largest population ever found.

There is evidence of merging and gases in excess of 100 million degrees. The very large mass of this cluster makes it useful for the study of dark matter and gravitational lensing.

At the time of its discovery in 2008, one of the lensed galaxies, A1689-zD1, was the most distant galaxy found.

Gallery

See also
 Abell catalogue
 Gravitational lensing
 List of Abell clusters

References

External links

 Galaxy cluster Abell 1689: Biggest 'Zoom Lens' in Space Takes Hubble Deeper into the Universe (HubbleSite)
 Galaxy cluster Abell 1689: Astronomers Find One of the Youngest and Brightest Galaxies in the Early Universe (HubbleSite)
 Astronomers take a step towards revealing the Universe's biggest mystery, ESA/Hubble Press Release.

1689
Galaxy clusters
Virgo (constellation)
Gravitational lensing
Abell richness class 4